The 1934 GP Ouest-France was the fourth edition of the GP Ouest-France cycle race and was held on 28 August 1934. The race started and finished in Plouay. The race was won by Lucien Tulot.

General classification

References

1934
1934 in road cycling
1934 in French sport